Macheret Trench (‘Padina Macheret’ \pa-'di-na ma-che-'ret\) is the narrow, elongated subglacial valley reaching a maximum depth of 120 m below sea level beneath upper Perunika Glacier on Livingston Island in the South Shetland Islands, Antarctica.  From its deepest section at 62°36'38.0"S by 60°15'55.0"W, situated north of Rezen Knoll, the feature extends below sea level 3.8 km in southeast direction to near Wörner Gap.

The feature is named after the Russian glaciologist Yuriy Macheret, leader of the Russian-Spanish-Uzbekistan ice cap radio sounding project that discovered the trench in 2006.

Location
Russian-Spanish-Uzbekistan mapping in 2009.

Maps
 L.L. Ivanov. Antarctica: Livingston Island and Greenwich, Robert, Snow and Smith Islands. Scale 1:120000 topographic map.  Troyan: Manfred Wörner Foundation, 2009.

References
 Macheret Trench. SCAR Composite Antarctic Gazetteer
 Bulgarian Antarctic Gazetteer. Antarctic Place-names Commission. (details in Bulgarian, basic data in English)

Landforms of Livingston Island
Bulgaria and the Antarctic